During the 1920–21 season Hearts competed in the Scottish Football League, the Scottish Cup and the East of Scotland Shield.

Fixtures

Scottish Cup

Scottish Football League

See also
List of Heart of Midlothian F.C. seasons

References

Statistical Record 20-21

External links
Official Club website

Heart of Midlothian F.C. seasons
Heart of Midlothian